La Séparation is a 1994 French romantic drama film directed by Christian Vincent and based on the novel La Séparation by Dan Franck.

Plot
When a Parisian couple, Pierre and Anne, go to see a film, it bothers Pierre that Anne rejects his hand during the screening. Afterwards Anne tells Pierre that she 'thinks she has fallen in love with someone else'. Pierre hears the news without responding. Both seem determined to remain composed and deal with Anne's love interest and Pierre's hurt pride rationally.

Pierre discusses the situation with mutual friends but their reassurances are little comfort. Anne's new relationship make Pierre stressed. An added complication of their 18-month-old son. Despite the presence of a nanny, each find reason to claim the other is neglecting him. Paranoia and recrimination escalate. Fights break out, most bitterly after Pierre discovers that Anne has taken their son to her mother's house.

Pierre surprises Anne at work and asks to talk. He is more composed and tells her that he has decided he must leave. Anne reciprocates with the news that her affair has ended. Digesting this news with the same outward calm as at the beginning of the film, Pierre walks Anne back to their flat. He feels unable to go in. Instead he wanders the streets, uncertain what to do and unable to hail a stream of passing taxis.

Cast
 Isabelle Huppert as Anne
 Daniel Auteuil as Pierre
 Jérôme Deschamps as Victor
 Karin Viard as Claire
 Laurence Lerel as Laurence
 Louis Vincent as Loulou
 Nina Morato as Marie

Critical reception
The film received two César Award nominations for Best Actor (Daniel Auteuil) and Best Actress (Isabelle Huppert) in 1995 (the year of its UK release). The film took four years to find a distributor in the United States but following its release in 1998 it was nominated for a 1999 Golden Satellite Award as Best Foreign Language Film.

See also
 Isabelle Huppert on screen and stage

References

External links
 
 

1994 films
1994 romantic drama films
Films directed by Christian Vincent
Films produced by Claude Berri
French romantic drama films
1990s French films